Willaston could be

Willaston, Cheshire East, England
Willaston, Cheshire West, England
Willaston, Flintshire, Wales
Willaston, Isle of Man, a suburb of Douglas, Isle of Man
Willaston, Oxfordshire, a lost settlement in the parish of Hethe
Willaston, Shropshire, a hamlet in Ightfield
Willaston, South Australia